Sheridan County School District #3 is a public school district based in Clearmont, Wyoming, United States. With an enrollment of 101 students (as of October 1, 2008), it is the second smallest school district in the state of Wyoming.

Geography
Sheridan County School District #3 serves the eastern portion of Sheridan County.

Incorporated places
Town of Clearmont
Census-designated places (Note: All census-designated places are unincorporated.)
Arvada
Unincorporated places
Leiter

Schools
Arvada-Clearmont High School (Grades 9–12)
Arvada-Clearmont Junior High School (Grades 7–8)
Arvada Elementary School (Grades K-6)
Clearmont Elementary School (Grades PK-6)

Student demographics
The following figures are as of October 1, 2008.

Total District Enrollment: 101
Student enrollment by gender
Male: 46 (45.54%)
Female: 55 (54.46%)
Student enrollment by ethnicity
White (not Hispanic): 92 (91.09%)
Hispanic: 6 (5.94%)
American Indian or Alaskan Native: 3 (2.97%)

See also
List of school districts in Wyoming

References

External links
Sheridan County School District #3 – official site.

Education in Sheridan County, Wyoming
School districts in Wyoming